Amogh was a king of the Kuninda Kingdom in northern India, during the late 2nd century BCE to early 1st century BCE.

He is well known for his beautiful silver and copper coinage where his name is mentioned, along with his title, Maharaja. His silver coinage followed the silver standard of the Indo-Greek coins, suggesting the existence of commercial exchanges with these neighbours. The obverse of his silver coins bears a legend in Brahmi: Rajnah Kunindasya Amoghabhutisya maharajasya and the reverse bears a legend in Kharoshti: Rana Kunindasa Amoghabhutisa Maharajasa. His copper coins bear on the obverse the same Brahmi legend as his silver issues but the Kharoshti legend on the obverse is replaced by a border of dots.

See also 
 Kuninda Kingdom
 History of Uttarakhand

Notes

References

2nd-century BC Indian monarchs
1st-century BC Indian monarchs